Ayodeji Sotona (born 7 December 2002) is an Irish professional footballer who plays as a forward for Burnley Academy.

Club career
Sotona was born in Waterford, but moved to Mullingar as a child, where he joined local side Mullingar Athletic. At a young age, he joined the Mullingar Harriers Athletic Club, picking up several provincial and national sprinting medals, including an All-Ireland bronze medal in 2013.

At the age of 13, he began attracting attention from English sides Manchester City and Manchester United, eventually signing with the latter. While at Manchester United, Sotona was named as the club's fastest player, ahead of first team members Diogo Dalot, Marcus Rashford and Daniel James. After four years with the club, in which he trained with the first team, he rejected the offer of a three-year extension to his contract, and left the club as a free agent in September 2020.

After a phone call with Patrick Vieira, who was managing Nice at the time, Sotona decided to join the French side at the expiration of his contract with Manchester United. Vieira had promised first-team football, but after he was sacked in December 2020, new manager Adrian Ursea assigned Sotona to the reserves. With the COVID-19 pandemic disrupting the footballing schedule, he struggled for game time, and when a return to England with Brentford presented itself in January 2022, Sotona took the opportunity, and joined on a six-month loan deal.

On 9 August 2022, Sotona signed for Scottish club Kilmarnock on a season-long loan. He returned to Nice in January 2023.

On 30 January 2023, Sotona moved to Burnley Academy.

International career
Sotona is eligible to represent the Republic of Ireland, Nigeria and England at international level. He has represented the Republic of Ireland at under-15 and under-16 level.

Career statistics

Club

Notes

References

2002 births
Living people
People from Waterford (city)
Irish people of Nigerian descent
Republic of Ireland association footballers
Republic of Ireland youth international footballers
Association football forwards
Manchester United F.C. players
OGC Nice players
Brentford F.C. players
Kilmarnock F.C. players
Burnley F.C. players
Scottish Professional Football League players
Republic of Ireland expatriate association footballers
Irish expatriate sportspeople in France
Expatriate footballers in France
Irish expatriate sportspeople in Scotland
Expatriate footballers in Scotland
Irish expatriate sportspeople in England
Expatriate footballers in England